Kujanaq (also Romanized as Kūjanaq and Kūjnaq; also known as Koojanagh) is a village in Dasht Rural District, in the Central District of Meshgin Shahr County, Ardabil Province, Iran. At the 2006 census, its population was 2,487, in 514 families.

References 

Towns and villages in Meshgin Shahr County